Commemoration Day for the Victims of Communist Genocide commemorates the Latvian residents deported from Latvia by the Soviet authorities. It is observed on both 25 March and 14 June when the respective 1949 March deportation and the 1941 June deportation took place. Commemoration Day for the Victims of Communist Genocide is marked by a procession organized by the Latvian Association of Politically Repressed Persons from the Museum of the Occupation of Latvia to the Freedom Monument where flowers are laid and attended by the President of Latvia, Speaker of the Saeima and the Prime Minister of Latvia.

See also 
Day of Remembrance of the Victims of Political Repressions

References 

Deportation from Latvia
Observances in Latvia
March observances
June observances